Angel Tec-i Hobayan (December 11, 1929 – March 11, 2023) was a Filipino bishop of the Roman Catholic Church. He was the first Bishop of Catarman from 1974 to 2005.

Ministry

Priesthood
Hobayan received the Sacrament of Holy Orders for the Diocese of Calbayog on March 25, 1955. On October 22, 1960, he was ordinated into the clergy of the newly formed Borongan Diocese. He later served as Vicar General of the Diocese of Borongan and Regent of the Jesus Nazareno Seminary in Borongan. From 1968 to 1969, Hobayan led the Diocese of Borongan during the vacancy of the Sede as Capitular Vicar. Pope Paul VI awarded him the papal honorary title of Apostolic Protonotary on June 28, 1974.

Bishop
On December 12, 1974, Pope Paul VI appointed him as the first bishop of Catarman. The Apostolic Nuncio to the Philippines, Archbishop Bruno Torpigliani, ordained him as a bishop on March 5, 1975, in the Cathedral of the Nativity of the Blessed Virgin Mary in Borongan; Co-consecrators were the Godofredo Pedernal Pisig, Bishop of Borongan, and Ricardo Pido Tancinco, Bishop of Calbayog. Hobayan chose the motto Caritas justitiaque Christi (“The charity and justice of Christ”). The inauguration took place on March 11, 1975.

Pope John Paul II accepted his retirement on March 10, 2005.

Death
Hobayan died at the Cardinal Santos Medical Center in San Juan, Metro Manila, on March 11, 2023. He was 93.

References

External links
Angel Hobayan at Catholic Hierarchy

1929 births
2023 deaths
20th-century Roman Catholic bishops in the Philippines
21st-century Roman Catholic bishops in the Philippines
People from Eastern Samar
Bishops appointed by Pope Paul VI